"Just Tonight" is a song by American rock band The Pretty Reckless from their debut studio album, Light Me Up (2010). Band members Taylor Momsen and Ben Phillips co-wrote the song with its producer, Kato Khandwala. It was released on December 23, 2010, as the third and final single from the album.

Release
The release date for the single was originally announced as November 9, 2010 before being pushed back to December 13. The release date was pushed back again to December 26, when it was released as a digital download.

Critical reception
"Just Tonight" received mostly positive reviews from critics. Robert Copsey of Digital Spy gave it four out of five stars, saying, "A song about being stuck in a flagging relationship may not tread any new lyrical ground, but when it's backed by a chunky pop/rock melody, thrashing guitars and oh-so smoky vocals, the result is more gratifying than that first sip of blue WKD round ya mate's". Fraser McAlpine of BBC Radio 1's The Chart Blog gave the song four out of five stars, praising singer Momsen's vocals and describing the song as "a thoughtful, hurt sort of a song" that "plays straight—from the heart to the heart—and is all the better for it." OddOne of Unreality Shout rated the song four-and-a-half out of five stars, calling it "just brilliant—there's hooks, emotion, thought-provoking lyrics, all topped off with a monstrous chorus that brings plenty of teenaged angst to proceedings". In a less enthusiastic review, Rebecca Nicholson of The Guardian felt that the song "sounds like Evanescence doing a song for the sole reason of soundtracking an emotional scene on Grey's Anatomy".

Live performances
In the United Kingdom, the band performed "Just Tonight" on BBC Radio 1's Live Lounge and on Live from Studio Five on December 11, 2010. In the United States, they performed the song on Lopez Tonight on February 11, 2011.

Music video
The video for the song was directed by Meiert Avis, who had directed the videos for the band's previous singles, "Make Me Wanna Die" and "Miss Nothing". The video was shot on location at the Kingsbridge Armory in the Bronx, New York City, and premiered on Vevo on November 2, 2010. It was featured as the "Free Music Video of the Week" in February 2011 on iTunes.

Track listing
UK and Irish digital EP
"Just Tonight" – 2:47
"Just Tonight" (acoustic version) – 3:04
"Just Tonight" (music video) – 3:03

Credits and personnel
Credits adapted from the liner notes of Light Me Up.

The Pretty Reckless
 Taylor Momsen – vocals, backing vocals
 Ben Phillips – guitar
 Jamie Perkins – drums

Additional personnel
 Kato Khandwala – production, engineering, mixing, guitar, bass, percussion, programming, string arrangement
 John Bender – backing vocals
 Michael "Mitch" Milan – engineering assistance
 James Frazee – engineering assistance
 Jon Cohan – drum tech

Charts

Release history

References

External links
 
 

2010 singles
2010 songs
2010s ballads
Interscope Records singles
Music videos directed by Meiert Avis
The Pretty Reckless songs
Rock ballads
Songs written by Kato Khandwala
Songs written by Taylor Momsen